Patricia Elaine Miller (born March 20, 1947) is an American politician. She served in the Colorado House of Representatives as a Republican from 1991 until 1993, and was the candidate of the American Constitution Party for Lieutenant Governor of Colorado in 2010.

Biography
Miller was born in 1947 in Peoria, Illinois, and graduated from Lowpoint-Washburn High School in 1965. A former Democrat, she became a Republican after moving to Colorado in 1971 and reading the party platforms. In 1990, Miller was elected to represent the 27th district (which covered parts of Jefferson County) in the Colorado House of Representatives, serving one term before losing reelection in 1992. She ran for Colorado's 2nd congressional district in 1994 and 1996, both times losing to incumbent Democrat David Skaggs.

In 2010, Miller was selected as the Constitution Party's nominee for Lieutenant Governor of Colorado. Tom Tancredo had replaced Ben Goss as the party's candidate for governor, although Goss's running mate, Doug Campbell, initially remained on the ticket. Campbell withdrew from the race in order to allow Tancredo to select his own running mate. He announced his selection of Miller on a KHOW talk radio program on August 24, 2010. Tancredo and Miller lost the election to Democrats John Hickenlooper and Joseph García.

During the 2012 Republican presidential primaries, Miller supported Rick Santorum, and she served on his campaign's Colorado Steering Committee.

In 2019, Miller announced that she was running for the position of State Representative in Colorado House District 63. She lost the Republican primary to Dan Woog.

Personal life
In addition to politics, Miller is also an author. , she has published six works of historical fiction and one mystery novel. In the fall of 2018, Miller's fifth book, Willfully Ignorant, received the second-place Grand Prize in the Xulon Press Christian Author Awards Book Contest. 
  
Miller and her husband, Richard Lynn Miller, have one adopted son and two grandchildren. She resides in Erie, Colorado.

Political positions
Miller opposes abortion. Between 1998 and 2004, she was director of Citizens for Responsible Government, an anti-abortion organization. In 2007, she co-founded Colorado Citizens for Life.

Miller stated she had a "strong conservative voting record", and opposes gun control. She is also opposed to illegal immigration, saying, "In the line at the grocery store, I hear people complaining about the immigration laws and the drain on taxpayers and the loss of jobs. I feel like we're handing over our country. It's very distressing to me."

Electoral history

References

1947 births
Living people
American anti-abortion activists
Candidates in the 1992 United States elections
Candidates in the 1994 United States elections
Candidates in the 1996 United States elections
Candidates in the 2010 United States elections
Colorado Constitutionalists
Colorado Democrats
Colorado Republicans
Members of the Colorado House of Representatives
People from Erie, Colorado
People from Jefferson County, Colorado
People from Peoria, Illinois
Women state legislators in Colorado
20th-century American politicians
20th-century American women politicians
21st-century American politicians
21st-century American women politicians